Solomon Islands is a sovereign country in Melanesia consisting of many islands with a population of 561,231 (2013). It became self-governing from the United Kingdom in 1976 after three previous attempts at forming a Constitution. The Constitution of Solomon Islands was enacted in 1978. This however led to conflicts between cultures and armed conflict in the late 1990s forced a review of the 1978 Constitution. This review resulted in the Federal Constitution of the Solomon Islands Bill 2004 (SI) and various other amendments. The Human Rights Chapter, however, remained unchanged.

As per The Constitution of Solomon Islands Statutory Instruments Chapter II outlines the Fundamental Rights and Freedoms of the Individual:

However, there are Human Rights concerns and issues in regards to education, water, sanitation, women and persons who identify as lesbian, gay, bisexual or transgender (LGBT)

International treaties
Solomon Islands joined the United Nations in 1978. It is party to four of the nine core human rights treaties - the International Covenant on Economic Social and Cultural Rights (ICESCR), the Convention on the Elimination of All Forms of Racial Discrimination (CERD), the Convention on the Elimination of All Forms of Discrimination Against Women (CEDAW) and the Convention on the Rights of the Child (CRC).  In May 2011, Solomon Islands issued a standing invitation to the UN Special Procedures.

Education
In a 2011, the UN released a UPR which outlined the current availability of education as being limited for the poor island state. Despite the government's 2010 policy statement, which committed to ensuring all Solomon Islanders have equal access to quality education, this is an ongoing issue that is still being addressed. Statistics show that overall primary attendance rate at 65.4 percent, this increased in urban areas to 72 percent.

Because of the ‘Fee Free Primary Education’ policy of the government, primary education is free and financed by overseas donors. However it is not compulsory. Article 15 of ICESCR requires compulsory primary education, as does article 28 of the CRC. In the report's recommends that basic primary quality education should be compulsory.

There is also limited access to education for children with disabilities. This is a cultural and social issue as well as a human rights concern. The traditional view is that persons with disabilities are cared for and looked after, therefore not required or expected to be an active part in the community. This charitable approach has led to the majority of children with disabilities having no real access to education. Following the Government's 2010 policy, the UPR urges the government to give this the highest priority to give children equal opportunity.

Another issue integrated to this is the lack of certified teachers who do not take interest in what they are doing. In a 2010 UNICEF mid-term report on education it was estimated that 50 percent of teachers in the Solomon Islands are unqualified. The report recommends that the government allocate more of its budget on developing an adequate infrastructure such as training professional teachers, having more schools and classrooms as well as ensuring teachers are paid on time.

Secondary school 
Article 28 1(b) of the CRC requires governments to encourage the development of different forms of secondary education, available and accessible to every child, and to take appropriate measures such as the introduction of free education and offering financial assistance in case of need. In a 2006-2007 survey, 29 out of every 100 children (12–18 years old) attended secondary school. This figure was worse in rural areas and people surveyed stated that secondary school fees were too expensive for families. The UPR report recommended increasing accessibility to secondary school.

Water and sanitation
The issue of safe drinking water is one that affects 355,000 Solomon Islanders. Although fresh water is available year-round in some places, the islands often suffer from severe water shortage. Water-borne disease and lack of proper sanitation is a major risk and concerned locals have commented that sickness caused from unsafe drinking water has prevented children from attending school. Around half of primary schools have access to safe drinking water. Article 15 ICESCR sets out the criteria for the full enjoyment of the right to water including availability, quality and accessibility.

In Honiara, the capital of Solomon Islands, there are many overcrowded slums as a result of people moving to urban areas in search of opportunities. There was not adequate infrastructure to deal with the influx of inhabitants during the 1970s and 1980s. This has resulted in the unavailability of clean water, leaving residents faced with a long and sometimes dangerous journey to find it. These people often opt instead to wash clothes, dishes and themselves in dirty water, putting them at risk of disease.

The right to sanitation is an integral part of the right to an adequate standard of living, defined in Article 11(1) of the ICESCR. As well as relating to right to health, housing and water, the UN CRC recognizes the right for access to sanitation. According to a 2009 survey of Honiara, only a quarter of residents had adequate toilet facilities. Around 55 percent relieved themselves either in the sea, a river, or nearby toilets.

Women's rights
Although the Solomon Islands are party to CEDAW, women's rights and access to adequate sanitation are limited. Women are not treated equally to men as witnessed by Amnesty International which reported they witnessed 100 young women and girls as well as 2 elderly men collect water from a broken pipe. When asked why no men were collecting the water, they replied that the men were drunk or playing sports. This was also found in another slum where the men were also high on drugs.

The lack of adequate water supply has led to a rise of violence against women, who have to walk further and more often to get water or to go toilet, bathe or to obtain drinking water. This is an issue especially in Honiara's slums where men attack women either physically or sexually making them too afraid to use communal toilets at night. Rape and other abuse is generally unreported to police as women and girls fear reprisals from their attackers. The government has acknowledged the ongoing violence towards women and in 2010 approved a national policy to eliminate violence against women. This was a result of lobbying by women's groups.

In 2011 the Women's Rights Action Movement was founded, which built on the lobbying of the previous years. Its purpose is to challenge the government of the Solomon Islands on women's rights issues, as well as to enable women to be part of political decision-making processes.

LGBT rights

Right to privacy
The lack of a women's right to privacy in Solomon Islands is more prevalent in the slums with shared bathing, washing and toilets facilities. There are reports of not being able to wash themselves adequately and being spied on or whistled at. A lack of privacy is demeaning and embarrassing.

Right to housing
When the issue of inadequate housing and facilities especially regarding the slums was broached to government officials, they explained it was the fault of the people and not of the government. The slums sit mostly on Honiara City Council Land, which the ministry of land, housing and survey is responsible for. This issue of state negligence has not been resolved.

Freedom of expression
On November 17, 2020, the country announced they will be banning Facebook, becoming only the fifth country in the world to do so. They cited abusive language, including against government officials, and the need to 'protect the youth' as the main reasons.

References

External links
 OHCHR Page on Solomon Islands
 Constitution of Solomon Islands
 Converging Currents: Custom and Human Rights in the Pacific (NZLC 2006)

Law of the Solomon Islands
  
Solomon Islands